"Tú Y Yo" (English: "You and I") is the first single from Thalía's 2002 self-titled album Thalía. The song was written by Estéfano and Julio Reyes, and produced by Estéfano. It was released on Thalia's 2003 English-language album, also titled Thalia. It topped the charts reaching number one at Billboard's hot Latin tracks, becoming her second number one single on this chart. The song also received airplay in European countries like Greece and Spain.

Commercial Performance
The song entered charts in America and Europe reaching the top spot in Mexico and the U.S. Latin charts. The song has sold 200,000 copies in the United States.

Music video
The music video for "Tú Y Yo" was directed by Antti Jokinen and shot in The Bronx, New York. In the video, Thalía sings in the streets, and also visits a music store, plays the guitar and drives a motorbike. In this video, Thalía's appearance is more aggressive. The video used Thalia's first version of the song with added vocals during the guitar drift. This version can still be heard when aired on TV, unlike its online streams. The same year she made a second version of the video with Kumbia Kings, for the cumbia version of the song, this time directed by Leche and Antti Jokinen.

Track listings
CD single
"Tú Y Yo" [album version] – 3:43
"Tú Y Yo" [ballad version] – 3:33

Maxi single
"Tú Y Yo" [album version] – 3:43
"Tú Y Yo" [cumbia remix] (feat. A.B. Quintanilla & Kumbia Kings) – 3:52
"Tú Y Yo" [cumbia norteña] – 3:44
"Tú Y Yo" [ballad version] – 3:33
"Tú Y Yo" [master's at bed remix long] – 9:46
"Tú Y Yo" [master's at bed remix radio edit] – 4:36

Official Remixes/Versions
Album Version
Ballad Version
Cumbia Remix (feat. A.B. Quintanilla & Kumbia Kings)
Cumbia Norteña
Latin Version (Unreleased)
Master's At Bed Mix
Master's At Bed Mix Edit
English Version
Video Version

Charts

Weekly charts

Year-end charts

Sales

Covers
In 2002 the Hong Kong girl group Cookies released a Cantonese version of the song titled " Hong Zu Jia You" as lead single of their album Happy Birthday. This helped the group become one of the best selling new groups of 2002 in Hong Kong.

References

Thalía songs
2002 singles
Spanish-language songs
Songs written by Estéfano
EMI Latin singles
2002 songs
Songs written by Julio Reyes Copello
Song recordings produced by Estéfano